Brigida Banti (1757–1806), best known by her husband's surname and her stage-name, as Brigida Banti, was an Italian soprano.

Biography

Obscure beginnings 
Her origins are rather obscure and the data on her birth are very dubious: she is thought to have been born in Crema, Lombardy, but some sources say she may have been born in Monticelli d'Ongina, a village in the province of Piacenza, which is located nearer to Cremona, in 1756 or possibly in 1758. She is the daughter of Carlo Giorgi, a street mandolin player; she too started her career as a street singer, either following her father around, or, according to different accounts, joining in with the double-bassist Domenico Dragonetti, when he was still a boy. The only established fact is that, in 1777–1778, on her travels around southern Europe, she reached Paris where a meeting with an important person in the profession completely was to change her life. However, sources are at variances as to the identity of that person. Details about her Parisian sojourn are scant and uncertain. She moved to London at an undetermined date, and there she met dancer and choreographer Zaccaria Banti, whom she married in Amsterdam in 1779 and whose surname she adopted as her stage-name.

The great European career 
After dropping round in Vienna in 1780, Banti decided to return to Italy when she was engaged at the Teatro San Benedetto in Venice for the 1782–1783 carnival season. Her performances in the premières of Piramo e Tisbe by Francesco Bianchi (who was to become her favourite composer), and  Attalo, re di Bitinia by Giuseppe Sarti, as well as in a revival of Bertoni's  were very successful by all accounts, raising enthusiasm in a listener out of the ordinary, such as the Irish tenor Michael Kelly. After Venice, she later sang in Turin, Milan, in Venice again, and also, in 1786–1787, in Warsaw, where she performed in operas by Giordani, Persichini and Tarchi. Finally, in the same 1787, she arrived at Teatro San Carlo in Naples, where she created the role of Sofonisba  in Bianchi's Scipione Africano, and also interpreted operas by Paisiello, Anfossi and Guglielmi. In 1789 Banti returned to Venice's Teatro San Benedetto where she was the first protagonist of Anfossi's Zenobia in Palmira, which became one of her favourite roles, as well as Semiramide, a character she created in Bianchi's La vendetta di Nino, at the end of the following year. In June 1792 she took part in the inauguration of the new theatre La Fenice in Venice, opposite the castrato Gaspare Pacchierotti (who exerted a strong artistic influence upon her throughout her career), in the first performance of Paisiello's I giuochi d'Agrigento.

After a brief season in Madrid in 1793, from 1794 to 1802 she was engaged, as the leading soprano, at London's King's Theatre, where she made her début as Semiramide  in La vendetta di Nino. There she met Lorenzo Da Ponte, who later reported she had been vulgar, impudent, dissolute and even a drunkard. Specifically, he said that she was "ignorant, foolish and insolent", and that she "took to theatre, where only her voice had led her, all habitudes, manners and morals of an impudent Corisca". He also credited her with a sexual relationship with William Taylor, manager of the King's Theatre. After getting back to Italy in 1802 autumn, owing to Elizabeth Billington's return to her country, she remained in demand on stage for some years both at La Scala and at la Fenice. With her health failing, her voice was getting more and more spoilt. She was forced to retire even though it would be very shortly before her premature death, in 1806. So marvellous and so powerful her very voice had been that her corpse was eventually subjected to an autopsy which revealed two extraordinarily large lungs. She has a painted tomb monument at the Certosa of Bologna.
Her son Giuseppe would publish a short biography of her, some sixty years later, in 1869.

Critical response 
A real naturally talented phenomenon: this could be Banti's summary description. Destitute of any musical education (she could not even read music, neither would she ever learn to), she had a terrific ear and used to learn parts by heart just listening to their execution a couple of times. Her contemporaries, from the mentioned tenor Kelly, to the painter Élisabeth Vigée Le Brun, to the great connoisseur of singing, Lord Mount Edgcumbe, agreed in praising her qualities. Mount Edgcumbe, for instance, wrote in his Musical Reminiscences: "Her voice was of most extensive compass, rich and even, and without a fault in its whole range – a true voce di petto throughout". She possessed, in fact, an exceedingly powerful voice, with an exquisite timbre and such remarkable flexibility, that she could fearlessly confront any kind of coloratura.

Her singing style, according to sharpest comment by Vigée Le Brun, was very similar to the castrato Pacchiarotti's (alongside whom, in fact, Banti happened to be on stage in numberless occasions); which meant she was able to excel at expressive intensity. In spite of her basic theoretical ignorance and her vulgar manners, Banti, owing to her natural talent, succeeded in growing a highly refined cantatrice and was able to shrink from outward appearance, from superficiality, and, in a word, from the decay of vocal taste which marked the 18th century's second half. Thus, she took her firm stand by the side of those even-aged or younger singers that, by re-establishing the good singing habits of yore, paved the way for Rossini bel canto's near developments.

 Roles created and significant performances 
The following is a list of significant performances of Banti's career (either world or local premieres).

 Notes 

 Sources 
 Bruce Carr, Banti, Brigida Giorgi, in Stanley Sadie (ed), The New Grove Dictionary of Opera, Oxford University Press, 1992, I, pp. 303–304
 Salvatore Caruselli (ed), Grande enciclopedia della musica lirica, vol. 4, Longanesi & C. Periodici, Roma 
 Rodolfo Celletti, Storia del belcanto, Discanto Edizioni, Fiesole, 1983 
 Rodolfo Celletti, La Grana della Voce. Opere, direttori e cantanti, Baldini & Castoldi, Milan, 2000 
 Lorenzo Da Ponte, Memorie, Bari, G. Laterza, 1918, now available free in a digital edition c/o Università degli studi di Roma La Sapienza (Biblioteca Italiana); original title: Memorie di Lorenzo da Ponte da Ceneda scritte da esso (New York, 1823–27, enlarged 2/1829–30) 
 Mario G. Genesi, Una primadonna tardosettecentesca: B. Giorgi-Banti (1755–1806), Edizioni Pro Loco di Monticelli d'Ongina, 1991, 228 pages 
 Harold Rosenthal and John Warrack, The Concise Oxford Dictionary of Opera, Oxford University Press, 1964, 1966, 1972, ad nomen Roberto Staccioli, "Giorgi (Banti Giorgi), Brigida", Dizionario Biografico degli Italiani'', 2001, volume 55 
 This article is a substantial translation from Brigida Banti in the Italian Wikipedia.

External links

1757 births
1806 deaths
People from Crema, Lombardy
Italian operatic sopranos
18th-century Italian actresses
Italian stage actresses
18th-century Italian women opera singers